Wichita Mountains Wildlife Refuge, located in southwestern Oklahoma near Lawton, has protected unique wildlife habitats since 1901 and is the oldest managed wildlife facility in the United States Fish and Wildlife Service system. The refuge's location in the geologically unique Wichita Mountains and its areas of undisturbed mixed grass prairie make it an important conservation area. The Wichita Mountains are approximately 500 million years old.

History
After the transfer of federal forests to the U.S. Forest Service in 1905, it became a National Forest on March 4, 1907, as Wichita National Forest.

On June 4, 1936, the Wichita Forest designation was abolished and transferred to the Bureau of Biological Survey, a precursor to the Fish and Wildlife Service. It was re-designated the Wichita Mountains Wildlife Refuge (WMWR).

United States Observances and Statutes Governing Wichita Mountains Wildlife Refuge

Description
The WMWR is managed by the U.S. Fish and Wildlife Service. There are 13 small lakes within the reserve.

Fauna 

According to the U. S. Fish & Wildlife Service, 240 species of birds, 50 species of mammals, 64 species of reptiles and amphibians, and 36 species of fish have been documented.

Several species of large native mammals make their home at the refuge: plains bison, also known as the American bison, elk, white-tailed deer graze the prairies along with Texas longhorn cattle preserved for their cultural and historic importance. Bison, longhorns, and elk were introduced after the establishment of the refuge. Merriam's elk, the original subspecies of elk in this area, is extinct, so the elk in the refuge are Rocky Mountain elk. The ancestors of the herd were imported from Jackson Hole, Wyoming in 1911. The elk herd is the largest in Oklahoma at about 1,000 and the white tailed deer number about 450. These ungulates are no longer considered endangered. Many smaller mammal species also live in the refuge, including the nine-banded armadillo, bassarisk, and the black-tailed prairie dog. Other species that have been reintroduced include: the river otter, burrowing owls and the prairie dog. Although these species were not listed as "endangered," USFWS policy is to assure that species that once were native to these mountains would always be found there. According to the Encyclopedia of Oklahoma History and Culture, the refuge failed in its attempt to reintroduce the American pronghorn antelope, bighorn sheep, and the prairie chicken.

The conservation of bison has become an ongoing, diverse effort. and the refuge was important in saving the American buffalo from extinction. In 1907 the American Bison Society transported 15 bison, six bulls and nine cows, from the Bronx Zoo. On arrival, the Comanche leader Quanah Parker and a host of other Indians and whites turned out to welcome the bison. At that time, bison had been extinct on the southern Great Plains for 30 years. The bison herd now numbers about 650 on the refuge. In fall, bison in excess of the carrying capacity of the refuge  were auctioned off but this practice was ended in 2020 when the refuge joined in the Bison Conservation Initiative. The 2020 Bison Conservation Initiative by the Department of the Interior has five central goals: wild, healthy bison herds; genetic conservation; shared stewardship; ecological restoration; and cultural restoration. It strengthened mechanisms for delivery of bison to Native American tribes from federal herds. In 1973, the refuge aided bison conservation by donating three bison to the Fort Worth Nature Center and Refuge.

The refuge is home to many species of birds, and it is one of the remaining homes of the recently delisted black-capped vireo.

Flora 
The refuge is ecologically diverse, with prairie, ravine, and mountain plant communities.  The many exposed granite boulders make exceptional habitat for a particularly photogenic, chartreuse green lichen known as "Pleopsidium flavum."  Portions of the refuge contain scrubby forest of mixed oak varieties.  A disjunct population of bigtooth maple is found here,  from the nearest natural population in West Texas.

Recreation 

There is no admission charge.  Public use areas on the refuge total . The remaining  has guided tours only. A visitor center and bookstore displays art and has exhibits illustrating the four major habitats found on the refuge:  Rocklands, Aquatic, Mixed-Grass Prairie, and Cross Timbers.

The refuge is a popular destination for recreational activities. Rock climbing is overwhelmingly popular, but visitors also enjoy hiking, camping, fishing, bird and wildlife watching, and photography.  The refuge has an extensive trail system, including about 15 miles of official trails and unofficial trails.  Many of these trails lead to climbing routes.  The area became popular for rock climbing beginning in the 1960s and 1970s, and has become something of a regional mecca.  Though climbing has brought many visitors to the refuge, some controversy exists over the use of fixed anchors, bolts and other permanently placed objects on the rock face.  The refuge has joined with The Access Fund and the Wichita Mountains Climbers Coalition to promote responsible use of the Wichitas' resources. Rock climbing routes are found on Mt. Scott, the refuge's second highest summit, as well as areas such as the Narrows and the Charon Gardens Wilderness Area.

Fishing for largemouth bass, sunfish, crappie, and channel catfish is popular in the thirteen artificial lakes on the refuge.  Elk and deer hunting, to cull excessive numbers, is permitted in a managed hunt every fall.  Hunters are chosen by lottery and a fee is charged.  A narrow winding road leads to the summit of Mount Scott, elevation 2,464 feet (751m), with a view that encompasses the whole refuge.  Although the mountains rise only 800 to 1000 feet above the surrounding prairie, they are steep and rocky.  The highest mountain in the refuge is Mount Pinchot which rises to 2,479 feet (756m). Mount Pinchot was named in honor of Gifford Pinchot who served as the first Chief of the United States Forest Service.

Climate

References

 Dead link -  February 20, 2017

External links 

 Official Site of the Wichita Mountains Refuge
 
 The Wichita Mountains Climbers Coalition
 WMWR at GORP.com
 Oklahoma Digital Maps: Digital Collections of Oklahoma and Indian Territory
 O'Dell, Larry: Holy City of the Wichitas Pageant - Encyclopedia of Oklahoma History and Culture - Oklahoma Historical Society
Photo gallery of the 2013 spring wildflower display by USFWS

National Wildlife Refuges in Oklahoma
Protected areas of Comanche County, Oklahoma
Protected areas established in 1901
Nature centers in Oklahoma
Former National Forests of the United States
1901 establishments in Oklahoma Territory